Confederate Railroad is the debut studio album by the American country music band of the same name, released on April 28, 1992 via Atlantic Records. It peaked at #7 on the US country albums chart, and #19 on the Canadian country chart. It was certified 2×Multi-Platinum by the RIAA.

Singles released from the album include "She Took It Like a Man", "Jesus and Mama", "Queen of Memphis", "When You Leave That Way You Can Never Go Back", "Trashy Women" and "She Never Cried". "When You Leave That Way You Can Never Go Back" was previously a single in 1985 for Bill Anderson from his album Yesterday, Today, and Tomorrow.

Track listing

Personnel

Confederate Railroad
 Mark Dufresne - drums
 Michael Lamb - electric guitar, background vocals
 Chris McDaniel - keyboards, background vocals
 Gates Nichols - steel guitar, background vocals
 Wayne Secrest - bass guitar
 Danny Shirley - acoustic guitar, lead vocals

Additional Musicians
 Eddie Bayers - drums
 Barry Beckett - keyboards
 Michele Lamb - background vocals
 "Cowboy" Eddie Long - steel guitar
 Don Potter - acoustic guitar
 Suzi Ragsdale - background vocals
 Michael Rhodes - bass guitar
 Brent Rowan - electric guitar
 Harry Stinson - background vocals
 Billy Joe Walker Jr. - acoustic guitar
 Dennis Wilson - background vocals
 Bob Wray - bass guitar
 Curtis Young - background vocals

Charts

Weekly charts

Year-end charts

Singles

References

Allmusic

Confederate Railroad albums
1992 debut albums
Atlantic Records albums
Albums produced by Barry Beckett